Nadezhda Gumerova (born January 1, 1949) is a retired female long-distance runner from Kazakhstan, who represented the Soviet Union during her career. She is best known for winning the gold medal in the women's marathon race at the 1986 Goodwill Games.  She placed eighth at the New York City Marathon in 1982 with a time of 2:35:37.

International competitions

References
 ARRS 1982 Year Ranking
 European Marathon Cup

1949 births
Living people
Soviet female long-distance runners
Soviet female marathon runners
Kazakhstani female long-distance runners
Kazakhstani female marathon runners
Kazakhstani ultramarathon runners
Female ultramarathon runners
Goodwill Games medalists in athletics
Competitors at the 1986 Goodwill Games